John Barker (ca. 1532–1589), of Ipswich, Suffolk, was an English politician.

He was a Member of Parliament (MP) for Ipswich in 1584, 1586 and 1589.

References

1530s births
1589 deaths
Members of the Parliament of England (pre-1707) for Ipswich
English MPs 1584–1585
English MPs 1586–1587
English MPs 1589